The United Kingdom of Great Britain and Northern Ireland competed as Great Britain at the 1960 Winter Olympics in Squaw Valley, United States.

Alpine skiing

Men

Women

Biathlon

 1 Two minutes added per missed target.

Cross-country skiing

Men

Figure skating

Men

Women

Speed skating

Men

References
Official Olympic Reports
International Olympic Committee results database
 Olympic Winter Games 1960, full results by sports-reference.com

Nations at the 1960 Winter Olympics
1960
Winter Olympics
Winter sports in the United Kingdom